Parey Hut Love is a 2019 Pakistani romantic comedy film, directed by Asim Raza. Written by Imran Aslam, the story revolves around a young free-willed, commitment-phobic, aspiring actor Sheheryar (Sheheryar Munawar) and a strong-willed girl, Saniya (Maya Ali) and their romance as they meet and fall in love over a series of unplanned encounters at the weddings of their friends and family. Parey Hut Love also stars Nadeem Baig, Ahmed Ali Butt, Zara Noor Abbas, Hina Dilpazeer, Faheem Azam, Rachel Viccaji, Munawar Siddiqui, Parisheh James, Jimmy Khan, Frieha Altaf, Yousuf Bashir Qureshi & Shahbaz Shigri in prominent roles. The film also features a cameo by actress Mahira Khan and a special appearance by actor Fawad Khan. There are also cameos from Meera, Sonya Jehan, Ahmad Ali Akbar, Cybil Chowdhry and others. The movie is Maya Ali’s second movie after her super hit Teefa in Trouble.

The music is directed by Azaan Sami Khan and the cinematography is by Serkan Güler and Salman Razzaq. The production designer is Hina Farooqui, Art director is Saqib Hayat, and Stylist is Haani Sharique. The film is loosely based on the 1994 British film Four Weddings and a Funeral. It was released internationally on 8 August 2019 and in Pakistan on Eid al-Azha, 12 August 2019, under the production banner of The Vision Factory Films distributed by ARY Films, Salman Iqbal Films, and B4U Motion Pictures.

Plot
The main plot is divided into four chapters

Chapter One: Natasha's wedding

The film starts with the preparations for Natasha's wedding going in full swing. A close cousin of Natasha, Shehryar Aziz is a struggling drama actor. His two friends are Arshad (an aspiring director) and Shabbo. Shehryar is a commitment-phobe and hates it when his mother, Farida, brings up the subject of getting him married.

At Natasha's wedding, he meets Natasha's cousin, Saniya who has come from Turkey. Shehryar is instantly smitten by her and he tries to flirt with her. At night, he takes Saniya to explore Karachi, the city of lights without informing anyone and the two fall in love. When Shehryar asks for her phone number, she jokes that given his nature, she would give him her phone number and then she would keep waiting for his calls and he will ignore her. She, nevertheless, gives him her number. Shehryar learns from Saniya that she would be leaving in two days and was in Pakistan to attend Natasha's wedding and to drop her father, Faisal (who is a famous writer) with his family members in his homeland just as he wished.

Saniya goes back to Turkey. Farida decides to join the drama industry just to 'pass time' which frustrates Shehryar immensely and in his frustration and his friends teasing him about Saniya, he ignores several calls and texts from her. As he is about to receive her call, he is mugged and Saniya comes to believe that Shehryar has used her.

Chapter Two: Rustom's Wedding

Faisal writes the script for a drama titled Parey Hut Love and informs Shehryar that he would be cast as the lead. Shehryar is overjoyed but has no one to finance the production of the film. Meanwhile, Farida makes it big in the industry and becomes famous. Rustom, a distant relative of Shehryar who is a Parsi proposes to Tanaaz, his cousin. Shehryar is elated to learn that Saniya has come for the wedding but is heartbroken when Saniya makes him meet her fiancé, Hassan. She deliberately attempts to make Shehryar jealous by openly praising Hassan.

The wedding takes place. Shehryar confronts Saniya after it and tells her that his phone was stolen. Saniya refuses to believe him and tells him that it is too late and that she will not leave Hassan at any cost.

Shehryar goes to several producers only to be repeatedly rejected for the script of Parey Hut Love. Shehryar's stepfather (who Shehryar calls 'Half Dad') finances the production. Shehryar for the first time calls him 'dad'.

The production of Parey Hut Love begins but Saniya arrives to inform Shehryar of Faisal's increasing brain tumor and gives him the card for her wedding which is to take place in Kashmir, Faisal's hometown. This leads to a major fight between Sheheryar and Arshad who is more focused on his project. Shehryar leaves for Kashmir. Arshad follows him and they reunite. Shehryar tells Saniya that his biological father did not love him at all, even though Shehryar loved him and left him and his mother. Thus, he became a commitment phobe.

Chapter Three: Saniya's Wedding

Saniya's wedding comes up and Sheheryar falls into depression stemming from Saniya's rejection. 
Shehryar begs her to forgive him and marry him, and to leave Hassan but Saniya implies that she can't. Meanwhile, Faisal passes away. The wedding is immediately postponed and Faisal's funeral is arranged. Saniya leaves in misery, caused by her father's death and Shehryar's fierce love for her.

Chapter Four: Shehryar's wedding

A few years later, Shehryar is a successful actor and is engaged to megastar Zeena, who loves him. Shehryar also reciprocates her feelings but still loves Saniya. Saniya tells Hassan that she is in love with Shehryar and breaks her engagement with him. Hassan forgives her and they continue as friends. Saniya, having learned of Shehryar's wedding (which is to take place in Turkey) from media reports, arrives at the wedding and tells Shehryar that she left Hassan because she told him that she loved someone else. Shehryar's feelings for Saniya rekindle. Zeena realizes Shehryar loves Saniya and not her, after seeing Saniya leave his room.
At the wedding, Zeena motivates Shehryar to go after Saniya who was leaving for another city. Shehryar goes after her. Arshad and Shabbo express their liking for each other.
Shehryar finds Saniya and tells her that he left Zeena because she found out that he loved someone else. The movie ends on a happy note with Shehryar and Saniya embracing each other.

Cast 
 Sheheryar Munawar as Sheheryar
 Maya Ali as Saniya
 Ahmed Ali Butt as Arshad
 Zara Noor Abbas as Shabbo
 Nadeem Baig as Faisal
 Hina Dilpazeer as Farida
 Durdana Butt as Amma Jaan
 Shahbaz Shigri as Hasan
 Munawar Alam Siddiqui as Aziz
 Rachel Viccaji as Tanaaz
 Faheem Azam as Rustom
 Yousuf Bashir Qureshi as Mehmood
 Frieha Altaf as Feroza
 Parisheh James as Natasha
 Jimmy Khan as Anwar

Cameo appearances 
 Fawad Khan
 Mahira Khan as Zeena
 Marina Khan 
 Sonya Jehan
 Imran Aslam
 Cybil Chowdhry
 Meera as Karishma Chaudhry
 Saife Hassan
 Supriya Shukla

Production
Pre-production of the film began in July 2018. Sheheryar Munawar, who was producing the film, wanted to cast Mahira Khan but due to date issues, she couldn't take the role. Maya Ali was later cast in the same role. Mahira Khan, however, made a cameo as Zeena in the film. The film was written by Imran Aslam."

Filming 
Principal Photography took place in Karachi, Bahawalpur, and Muzaffarabad(Azad Kashmir), Pakistan.The second spell of film was shot in Istanbul, Turkey.The shoot concluded with a star-studded wrap up party in Karachi.

Marketing and release
The official theatrical trailer of the film was launched on 21 June 2019 by ARY Digital. The trailer garnered 2.2 million views since its release on YouTube. Its song "Haye Dil Bechara" crossed a total of 10 million views on YouTube.

The film has been certified with a runtime of 137 minutes by the British Board of Film Classification and was released on Eid al-Adha, on 12 August 2019.

Home media
The World Television Premiere of the film was held by ARY Digital on Eid-ul-Adha, in August 2020.

Digital media 
Parey Hut Love was made available on Amazon Prime Video for streaming.

Reception
The film received positive reviews from audiences and critics alike. It emerged as the highest-grossing Lollywood movie for the year 2019 with a worldwide collection of more than PKR 300  million including PKR 240  million from the local box office. The cinematography was especially lauded as it showcased the beauty of Pakistan. The movie was also praised for its music.

Accolades

Soundtrack

See also 
 List of Pakistani films of 2019

References

External links 
 

2019 films
2010s Urdu-language films
2019 romantic comedy films
Pakistani romantic comedy films
Films directed by Asim Raza